Mehmed Sabri (Bulgarian: Мехмед Сабри; born 12 September 1998) is a Bulgarian professional footballer who plays as a forward or winger.

Career
Sabri began his career in the local Ludogorets Razgrad in 2009. He played for Ludogorets Razgrad II, before moving to Hitrino, Wacker 50 and Chernolomets 04. In 2021 he joined Spartak Varna, which whom he won a promote to First League. He debuted in the top league of Bulgaria on 11 July 2022, in the first match of the season against Slavia Sofia.

Personal life
In 2019 Mehmed married his long-term girlfriend Samara, which is the sister of the wife of his ex-teammate Marcelinho.

References

External links
 

1998 births
Living people
Bulgarian footballers
PFC Ludogorets Razgrad II players
PFC Spartak Varna players
Association football midfielders
First Professional Football League (Bulgaria) players
People from Razgrad